Lentibacillus cibarius is a Gram-positive, aerobic, spore-forming, halophilic, rod-shaped and non-motile bacterium from the genus of Lentibacillus which has been isolated from Kimchi.

References

Bacillaceae
Bacteria described in 2021